Saint-Apollinaire is a municipality in the Municipalité régionale de comté de Lotbinière in Quebec, Canada. It is part of the Chaudière-Appalaches region and the population is 7,968 as of 2021. It is named after Saint Apollinaris.

History
In 1738, Angélique le Gardeur, daughter of the seigneur of Tilly, became a widow and was granted a seigneury which she named the seigneury of Gaspé, after her late husband. This seigniory is located to the south of the seigniory of Tilly. the current municipality of St-Apollinaire is within the limits of that seigneury of Gaspé. In 1806, a road crossing the territory of the seigneury of Gaspé was opened between Saint-Nicolas (today Lévis) and Saint-Gilles, which allowed the developpement of the county of Lotbinière. The municipality is canonically imposed on November 23, 1853, and on July 1, 1855, the parish municipality of Saint-Apollinaire is officially founded. The territory then grows rapidly. There is the construction of the first school, the arrival of the railway, the installation of the first telegraph line. The telephone arrives in 1905  Saint-Apollinaire was amputed of parts of its territory on two separate occasions. First in 1867 for the creation of Saint-Agapit-de-Beaurivage (founded from a section of Saint-Gilles also) and a second time in 1919 for the creation of Francoeur.

In the 1960s, the Trans-Canada Highway, which runs from western Canada to the east, was built and passed through the municipality. Being a busy road, several businesses will be built near it at the location of Saint-Apollinaire. These businesses will create greater appeal in settling in Saint-Apollinaire. The current Municipality of Saint-Apollinaire was finally formed on April 6, 1974, when the village of Francoeur and the parish municipality of Saint-Apollinaire merged to form the new municipality of Saint-Apollinaire.

In 2017, a Muslim cemetery project was refused by the citizens. This project received media attention and its refusal created a negative image of the municipality. Also, the Martin Carpentier Affair happened in Saint-Apollinaire.

Geography
Saint-Apollinaire is located on the south shore of the St. Lawrence River. The municipality covers an area of 97 km2. The territory of the municipality is crossed by Autoroute 20 from east to west and by Route 273 from north to south.

The municipality is surrounded by six municipalities. It is located at the limits of the Lotbinière RCM, bordering Lévis to the east. The other municipalities around Saint-Apollinaire are also part of the Lotbinière RCM: to the north, there is Saint-Antoine-de-Tilly; to the west, there is Notre-Dame-du-Sacré-Cœur-d'Issoudun; to the southwest, there is Saint-Flavien; to the south, there is Saint-Agapit and, to the southeast, there is Saint-Gilles. The municipality is located about 20 km from the bridges of Quebec City. The municipality is located 10 minutes by car from Quebec City and Lévis via Autoroute 20. Another nearby town is Sainte-Marie, located 40 minutes away by car.

References

External links

Commission de toponymie du Québec: Saint-Apollinaire 
Ministère des Affaires municipales, des Régions et de l'Occupation du territoire 

Municipalities in Quebec
Incorporated places in Chaudière-Appalaches
Lotbinière Regional County Municipality